Vallabhapuram
Guntur District, Andhra Pradesh, India. Village is located at the banks of Krishna river. Famous for the goddess perantallamma in neighbouring villages.

External links
Download Vallabhapuram and Kurvapur reference images
Vallabhapuram banking information at The Times of India

Samadhis
Hindu temples in Telangana